Dorset & Wilts 2 North is an English Rugby Union league, forming part of the South West Division, for clubs based primarily in Wiltshire, sitting at tier 9 of the English rugby union system. From this league teams can either be promoted to Dorset & Wilts 1 North or relegated to Dorset & Wilts 3 North.  Each year 1st XV clubs in this division also take part in the RFU Junior Vase – a level 9–12 national competition.

2021–22

Amesbury, Combe Down II, Melksham II and Trowbridge II did not return as all were level transferred to Dorset & Wilts 2 Central which was newly formed for that season.

2020–21
Due to the COVID-19 pandemic, the 2020–21 season was cancelled.

2019–20

2018–19

2017–18

2016–17
Avonvale
Bath Saracens
Calne
Chippenham III (promoted from Dorset & Wilts 3 North)
Colerne (relegated from Dorset & Wilts 1 North)
Combe Down II
Cricklade
Melksham II
Royal Wootton Bassett III (promoted from Dorset & Wilts 3 North)
Sutton Begner
Trowbridge II
Westbury

2015–16

The 2015–16 Dorset & Wilts 2 North consisted of twelve teams; most of them based in the northern part of Wiltshire but also three teams based just across the county border in Somerset. The season started on 12 September 2015 and was due to end on 23 April 2016.

Seven of the twelve teams participated in last season's competition. The 2014–15 champions, Royal Wootton Bassett II were promoted to Dorset & Wilts 1 North along with runners up Colerne while Supermarine II and Chippenham III were relegated to Dorset & Wilts 3 North.

Participating clubs 2012–13
Bath Saracens		 	 
Chippenham III			 	 
Combe Down II
Corsham II
Cricklade
Fairford	
Melksham II 	 
Supermarine II			 	 
Sutton Benger		
Swindon College Old Boys II	 	 
Westbury II
Wootton Bassett II

Participating clubs 2009–10
Bath Saracens
Bradford-on-Avon II
Chippenham III
Colerne
Combe Down
Devizes II
Fairford
Melksham II
Minety II
Pewsey Vale
Swindon College Old Boys II
Wooton Bassett III

Original teams
When league rugby began in 1987 this division (known as Berks/Dorset/Wilts 2) contained the following teams from Berkshire, Dorset and Wiltshire:

Bradford-on-Avon
Chippenham
Corsham
Lytchett Minster
Minety
North Dorset
Oakmedians
Poole
Puddletown
Swindon College Old Boys
Supermarine
Trowbridge

Dorset & Wilts 2 North honours

Berks/Dorset/Wilts 2 (1987–1993)

Originally Dorset & Wilts 2 North and Dorset & Wilts 2 South were combined in a single division known as Berks/Dorset/Wilts 2, involving clubs based in Berkshire, Dorset and Wiltshire.  It was a tier 9 league with promotion to Berks/Dorset/Wilts 1 and, from the 1988–89 season onward, relegation was to either Berks/Dorset/Wilts 3 East or Berks/Dorset/Wilts 3 West.

Berks/Dorset/Wilts 2 (1993–1996)

The creation of National League 5 South for the 1993–94 season meant that Berks/Dorset/Wilts 2 dropped to become a tier 10 league.  Promotion continued to Berks/Dorset/Wilts 1, while relegation was now to Berks/Dorset/Wilts 3.

Berks/Dorset/Wilts 2 (1996–2000)

The cancellation of National League 5 South at the end of the 1995–96 season meant that Berks/Dorset/Wilts 2 reverted to being a tier 9 league.  Promotion continued to Berks/Dorset/Wilts 1 and relegation to Berks/Dorset/Wilts 3.

Dorset & Wilts 2 North (2000–2004)

At the end of the 1999–2000 season Berks/Wilts/Dorset 2 was restructured following the departure of Berkshire clubs to join the Bucks & Oxon leagues.  It was now split into two tier 9 regional leagues – Dorset & Wilts 2 North and Dorset & Wilts 2 South.  Promotion from Dorset & Wilts 2 North was now to Dorset & Wilts 2 and there was no relegation due to the cancellation of Berks/Wilts/Dorset 3.

Dorset & Wilts 2 North (2004–2009)

Ahead of the 2004–05 season, local league restructuring meant that promotion from Dorset & Wilts 2 North was now to Dorset & Wilts 1 North (formerly Dorset & Wilts 1) and relegation to the newly introduced Dorset & Wilts 3 North (last known as Berks/Dorset/Wilts 3).  It remained a tier 9 league.

Dorset & Wilts 2 North (2009–present)

Despite widespread restructuring by the RFU at the end of the 2008–09 season, Dorset & Wilts 2 North remained a tier 9 league, with promotion continuing to Dorset & Wilts 1 North and relegation to Dorset & Wilts 3 North.

Number of league titles

Bournemouth University (2)
Frome II (2)
Marlborough (2)
Minety (2)
Pewsey Vale (2)
Sutton Benger (2)
Aldermaston (1) 
Avonvale (1)
Blandford (1) 
Bradford-on-Avon (1)
Calne (1)
Chippenham (1) 
Colerne (1)
Combe Down (1)
Cricklade (1)
Fairford (1)
Melksham (1)
North Dorset (1) 
Royal Wootton Bassett II (1)
Supermarine (1)
Swindon II (1)
Swindon College Old Boys (1)
Tadley (1)
Thatcham (1)
Trowbridge (1)
Trowbridge II (1)
Westbury (1)

See also 
 South West Division RFU
 Dorset & Wilts RFU
 English rugby union system
 Rugby union in England

Notes

References 

9
Rugby union in Dorset
Rugby union in Wiltshire